Coresthetopsis arachne is a species of beetle in the family Cerambycidae. It was described by Fauvel in 1906, originally under the genus Tricondyloides.

References

Parmenini
Beetles described in 1906